Tecklenborg Verlag is a publishing house based in Steinfurt, North Rhine-Westphalia, Germany that is internationally recognized for its illustrated books on wild animals, and for their nature-related magazines, which include Naturfoto  and Terra.

Books by internationally renowned photographers such as Fritz Pölking have been released within its program. It also publishes an annual collection of photos from the latest Wildlife Photographer of the Year competition.

References

External links 
 Homepage (In German only, although some books are only in English)

Book publishing companies of Germany
Publishing companies of Germany